The 2011–12 Pittsburgh Penguins season was the franchise's 45th season in the National Hockey League (NHL). The Penguins, led by head coach Dan Bylsma, would start the season without captain center Sidney Crosby. The team still managed a 51–25–6 record, an East-best 29 home wins, and their 108 points second-best in the Eastern Conference. In February, the team began the league's longest season winning streak and also saw the return of Crosby after missing more than 40 games with concussion like symptoms, before they saw the streak end in March at 11 games. Center Evgeni Malkin was able to play in 75 games despite difficulties associated with recent knee surgery and recorded his greatest goal tally in a season (50) on the way to winning his second Art Ross Trophy.  Marc-Andre Fleury tied a franchise record for goalie wins (226) in a victory against the Atlantic division winning-New York Rangers. The four-seed Penguins would see their playoff run end to the same team which halted their regular season winning streak, the Philadelphia Flyers, losing the first three games before perishing in Game 6 of the Eastern Conference Semi-finals.

On April 27, Malkin was one of three finalists for the Hart Memorial Trophy, marking his third-career nomination for the award. On June 20 Malkin finished first in votes for the Hart Trophy, earning his first career MVP award.

Pre-season

|-  style="background:#cfc;"
| 1 || September 21 || Detroit Red Wings || 2–3 || Pittsburgh Penguins || 1–0–0
|-  style="background:#cfc;"
| 2 || September 22 || Chicago Blackhawks || 1–4 || Pittsburgh Penguins || 2–0–0
|-  style="background:#cfc;"
| 3 || September 24 || Minnesota Wild || 1–4 || Pittsburgh Penguins || 3–0–0
|-  style="background:#cfc;"
| 4 || September 27 || Pittsburgh Penguins || 3 – 2 (SO) || Los Angeles Kings || 4–0–0
|-  style="background:#cfc;"
| 5 || September 30 || Pittsburgh Penguins || 4–2 || Chicago Blackhawks || 5–0–0
|-  style="background:#fcc;"
| 6 || October 2 || Pittsburgh Penguins || 2–3 || Detroit Red Wings || 5–1–0
|-

Regular season

Game log
Excluding 9 shootout-winning goals, the Penguins scored 273 goals overall, the most in the League.

|- style="background:#cfc;"
| 1 || 6  || 10:00 pm || Pittsburgh Penguins || 4–3 SO || Vancouver Canucks || Rogers Arena (18,860) || 1–0–0 || 2
|- style="background:#cfc;"
| 2 || 8  || 10:00 pm || Pittsburgh Penguins || 5–3 || Calgary Flames || Scotiabank Saddledome (19,289) || 2–0–0 || 4
|- style="background:#ffc;"
| 3 || 9  || 9:00 pm || Pittsburgh Penguins || 1–2 SO || Edmonton Oilers || Rexall Place (16,839) || 2–0–1 || 5
|- style="background:#cfc;"
| 4 || 11 || 7:30 pm || Florida Panthers || 2–4 || Pittsburgh Penguins || Consol Energy Center (18,503) || 3–0–1 || 7
|- style="background:#ffc;"
| 5 || 13 || 7:00 pm || Washington Capitals || 3–2 OT   || Pittsburgh Penguins || Consol Energy Center (18,512) || 3–0–2 || 8
|- style="background:#fcf;"
| 6 || 15 || 7:00 pm || Buffalo Sabres || 3–2 || Pittsburgh Penguins || Consol Energy Center (18,562) || 3–1–2 || 8
|- style="background:#fcf;"
| 7 || 17 || 8:30 pm || Pittsburgh Penguins || 1–2 || Winnipeg Jets || MTS Centre (15,004)  || 3–2–2 || 8
|- style="background:#cfc;"
| 8 || 18 || 7:30 pm || Pittsburgh Penguins || 4–2 || Minnesota Wild || Xcel Energy Center (17,297) || 4–2–2 || 10
|- style="background:#cfc;"
| 9 || 20 || 7:00 pm || Montreal Canadiens || 1–3 || Pittsburgh Penguins || Consol Energy Center (18,403) || 5–2–2 || 12
|- style="background:#cfc;"
| 10 || 22 || 7:00 pm || New Jersey Devils || 1–4 || Pittsburgh Penguins || Consol Energy Center (18,535) || 6–2–2 || 14
|- style="background:#cfc;"
| 11 || 25 || 7:00 pm || Pittsburgh Penguins || 3–0 || New York Islanders || Nassau Coliseum (10,681) || 7–2–2 || 16
|- style="background:#cfc;"
| 12 || 27 || 7:00 pm || New York Islanders || 2–3 SO || Pittsburgh Penguins || Consol Energy Center (18,461) || 8–2–2 || 18
|- style="background:#fcf;"
| 13 || 29 || 7:00 pm || Pittsburgh Penguins || 3–4 || Toronto Maple Leafs || Air Canada Centre (19,526) || 8–3–2 || 18
|-

|- style="background:#ffc;"
| 14 || 3 || 10:30 pm || Pittsburgh Penguins || 3–4 SO || San Jose Sharks || HP Pavilion at San Jose (17,562) || 8–3–3 || 19
|- style="background:#cfc;"
| 15 || 5 || 10:30 pm || Pittsburgh Penguins || 3–2 SO  || Los Angeles Kings || Staples Center (18,118) || 9–3–3 || 21
|- style="background:#cfc;"
| 16 || 11 || 7:00 pm || Dallas Stars || 1–3 || Pittsburgh Penguins || Consol Energy Center (18,585) || 10–3–3 || 23
|- style="background:#fcf;"
| 17 || 12 || 7:00 pm || Pittsburgh Penguins || 3–5 || Carolina Hurricanes || RBC Center (16,260) || 10–4–3 || 23
|- style="background:#cfc;"
| 18 || 15 || 7:30 pm || Colorado Avalanche || 3–6 || Pittsburgh Penguins || Consol Energy Center (18,483)|| 11–4–3 || 25
|- style="background:#fcf;"
| 19 || 17 || 7:30 pm || Pittsburgh Penguins || 1–3 || Tampa Bay Lightning || St. Pete Times Forum (18,509) || 11–5–3 || 25
|- style="background:#fcf;"
| 20 || 19 || 7:30 pm || Pittsburgh Penguins || 2–3 || Florida Panthers || BankAtlantic Center (18,071) || 11–6–3 || 25
|- style="background:#cfc;"
| 21 || 21 || 7:00 pm || New York Islanders || 0–5 || Pittsburgh Penguins || Consol Energy Center (18,571) || 12–6–3 || 27
|- style="background:#ffc;"
| 22 || 23 || 7:00 pm || St. Louis Blues || 3–2 OT  || Pittsburgh Penguins || Consol Energy Center (18,583) || 12–6–4 || 28
|- style="background:#cfc;"
| 23 || 25 || 7:00 pm || Ottawa Senators || 3–6 || Pittsburgh Penguins || Consol Energy Center (18,610) || 13–6–4 || 30
|- style="background:#cfc;"
| 24 || 26 || 7:00 pm || Pittsburgh Penguins || 4–3 OT  || Montreal Canadiens || Bell Centre (21,273) || 14–6–4 || 32
|- style="background:#fcf;" 
| 25 || 29 || 7:30 pm || Pittsburgh Penguins || 3–4 || New York Rangers || Madison Square Garden (18,200) || 14–7–4 || 32
|-

|- style="background:#cfc;" 
| 26 || 1 || 7:00 pm || Pittsburgh Penguins || 2–1 || Washington Capitals || Verizon Center (18,506) || 15–7–4 || 34
|- style="background:#cfc;" 
| 27 || 3 || 7:00 pm || Pittsburgh Penguins || 3–2 || Carolina Hurricanes || RBC Center (17,696) || 16–7–4 || 36
|- style="background:#fcf;"
| 28 || 5 || 7:00 pm || Boston Bruins || 3–1 || Pittsburgh Penguins || Consol Energy Center (18,585) || 16–8–4 || 36
|- style="background:#fcf;"
| 29 || 8 || 7:00 pm || Pittsburgh Penguins || 2–3 || Philadelphia Flyers || Wells Fargo Center (19,936) || 16–9–4 || 36
|- style="background:#cfc;" 
| 30 || 10 || 7:00 pm || Pittsburgh Penguins || 6–3 || New York Islanders || Nassau Coliseum (15,638) || 17–9–4 || 38
|- style="background:#fcf;"
| 31 || 13 || 7:00 pm || Detroit Red Wings || 4–1 || Pittsburgh Penguins || Consol Energy Center (18,592) || 17–10–4 || 38
|- style="background:#fcf;"
| 32 || 16 || 7:30 pm || Pittsburgh Penguins || 4–6 || Ottawa Senators || Scotiabank Place (19,710) || 17–11–4 || 38
|- style="background:#cfc;"
| 33 || 17 || 7:00 pm || Buffalo Sabres || 3–8 || Pittsburgh Penguins || Consol Energy Center (18,584) || 18–11–4 || 40
|- style="background:#cfc;"
| 34 || 20 || 7:30 pm || Chicago Blackhawks || 2–3 || Pittsburgh Penguins || Consol Energy Center (18,607) || 19–11–4 || 42
|- style="background:#cfc;"
| 35 || 23 || 8:30 pm || Pittsburgh Penguins || 4–1 || Winnipeg Jets || MTS Centre (15,004) || 20–11–4 || 44
|- style="background:#cfc;"
| 36 || 27 || 7:00 pm || Carolina Hurricanes || 2–4 || Pittsburgh Penguins || Consol Energy Center (18,600) || 21–11–4 || 46
|- style="background:#fcf;"
| 37 || 29 || 7:00 pm || Philadelphia Flyers || 4–2 || Pittsburgh Penguins || Consol Energy Center (18,602) || 21–12–4 || 46
|- style="background:#fcf;"
| 38 || 31 || 3:00 pm || Pittsburgh Penguins || 1–3 || New Jersey Devils || Prudential Center (17,625) || 21–13–4 || 46
|-

|- style="background:#fcf;"
| 39 || 6 || 7:00 pm || New York Rangers || 3–1 || Pittsburgh Penguins || Consol Energy Center (18,590) || 21–14–4 || 46
|- style="background:#fcf;"
| 40 || 7 || 7:00 pm || New Jersey Devils || 3–1 || Pittsburgh Penguins || Consol Energy Center (18,594) || 21–15–4 || 46
|- style="background:#fcf;"
| 41 || 10 || 7:00 pm || Ottawa Senators || 5–1 || Pittsburgh Penguins || Consol Energy Center (18,603) || 21–16–4 || 46
|- style="background:#fcf;"
| 42 || 11 || 7:30 pm || Pittsburgh Penguins || 0–1 || Washington Capitals || Verizon Center (18,506) || 21–17–4 || 46
|- style="background:#cfc;"
| 43 || 13 || 7:30 pm || Pittsburgh Penguins || 4–1 || Florida Panthers || BankAtlantic Center (18,658) || 22–17–4 || 48
|- style="background:#cfc;"
| 44 || 15 || 1:00 pm || Pittsburgh Penguins || 6–3 || Tampa Bay Lightning || St. Pete Times Forum (19,204) || 23–17–4 || 50
|- style="background:#cfc;"
| 45 || 17 || 7:00 pm || Carolina Hurricanes || 1–2 SO || Pittsburgh Penguins || Consol Energy Center (18,535) || 24–17–4 || 52
|- style="background:#cfc;"
| 46 || 19 || 7:00 pm || Pittsburgh Penguins || 4–1 || New York Rangers || Madison Square Garden (18,200) || 25–17–4 || 54
|- style="background:#cfc;"
| 47 || 20 || 7:00 pm || Montreal Canadiens || 4–5 SO || Pittsburgh Penguins || Consol Energy Center (18,588) || 26–17–4 || 56
|- style="background:#cfc;"
| 48 || 22 || 12:30 pm || Washington Capitals || 3–4 OT || Pittsburgh Penguins || Consol Energy Center (18,565) || 27–17–4 || 58
|- style="background:#cfc;"
| 49 || 24 || 8:00 pm || Pittsburgh Penguins || 3–2 SO || St. Louis Blues || Scottrade Center (18,471) || 28–17–4 || 60
|-
| colspan=9 | All-Star Break
|- style="background:#cfc;"
| 50 || 31 || 7:00 pm || Toronto Maple Leafs || 4–5 SO || Pittsburgh Penguins || Consol Energy Center (18,550) || 29–17–4 || 62
|-

|- style="background:#fcf;"
| 51 || 1 || 7:30 pm || Pittsburgh Penguins || 0–1 || Toronto Maple Leafs || Air Canada Centre (19,542) || 29–18–4 || 62
|- style="background:#cfc;"
| 52 || 4 || 1:00 pm || Pittsburgh Penguins || 2–1 || Boston Bruins || TD Garden (17,565) || 30–18–4 || 64
|- style="background:#fcf;"
| 53 || 5 || 1:00 pm || Pittsburgh Penguins || 2–5 || New Jersey Devils || Prudential Center (14,707) || 30–19–4 || 64
|- style="background:#ffc;"
| 54 || 7 || 7:30 pm || Pittsburgh Penguins || 2–3 SO || Montreal Canadiens || Bell Centre (21,273)|| 30–19–5 || 65
|- style="background:#cfc;"
| 55 || 11 || 2:00 pm || Winnipeg Jets || 5–8 || Pittsburgh Penguins || Consol Energy Center (18,602) || 31–19–5 || 67
|- style="background:#cfc;"
| 56 || 12 || 7:00 pm || Tampa Bay Lightning || 2–4 || Pittsburgh Penguins || Consol Energy Center (18,506) || 32–19–5 || 69
|- style="background:#fcf;"
| 57 || 15 || 7:00 pm || Anaheim Ducks || 2–1 || Pittsburgh Penguins || Consol Energy Center (18,482) || 32–20–5 || 69
|- style="background:#cfc;"
| 58 || 18 || 1:00 pm || Pittsburgh Penguins || 6–4 || Philadelphia Flyers || Wells Fargo Center (19,958) || 33–20–5 || 71
|- style="background:#fcf;"
| 59 || 19 || 12:30 pm || Pittsburgh Penguins || 2–6 || Buffalo Sabres || First Niagara Center (18,690) || 33–21–5 || 71
|- style="background:#cfc;"
| 60 || 21 || 7:00 pm || New York Rangers || 0–2 || Pittsburgh Penguins || Consol Energy Center (18,580) || 34–21–5 || 73
|- style="background:#cfc;"
| 61 || 25 || 1:00 pm || Tampa Bay Lightning || 1–8 || Pittsburgh Penguins || Consol Energy Center (18,596) || 35–21–5 || 75
|- style="background:#cfc;"
| 62 || 26 || 1:00 pm || Columbus Blue Jackets || 2–4 || Pittsburgh Penguins || Consol Energy Center (18,602) || 36–21–5 || 77
|- style="background:#cfc;"
| 63 || 29 || 7:30 pm || Pittsburgh Penguins || 4–3 SO || Dallas Stars || American Airlines Center (17,455) || 37–21–5 || 79
|-

|- style="background:#cfc;"
| 64 || 3 || 9:00 pm || Pittsburgh Penguins || 5–1 || Colorado Avalanche || Pepsi Center (18,007) || 38–21–5 || 81
|- style="background:#cfc;"
| 65 || 5 || 7:00 pm || Phoenix Coyotes || 1–2 || Pittsburgh Penguins || Consol Energy Center (18,540) || 39–21–5 || 83
|- style="background:#cfc;"
| 66 || 7 || 7:30 pm || Toronto Maple Leafs || 2–3 || Pittsburgh Penguins || Consol Energy Center (18,539) || 40–21–5 || 85
|- style="background:#cfc;"
| 67 || 9 || 7:00 pm || Florida Panthers || 2–1 SO || Pittsburgh Penguins || Consol Energy Center (18,606) || 41–21–5 || 87
|- style="background:#cfc;"
| 68 || 11 || 12:30 pm || Boston Bruins || 2–5 || Pittsburgh Penguins || Consol Energy Center (18,609) || 42–21–5 || 89
|- style="background:#cfc;"
| 69 || 15 || 7:00 pm || Pittsburgh Penguins || 5–2 || New York Rangers || Madison Square Garden (18,200) || 43–21–5 || 91
|- style="background:#cfc;"
| 70 || 17 || 1:00 pm || Pittsburgh Penguins || 5–2 || New Jersey Devils || Prudential Center (17,625) || 44–21–5 || 93
|- style="background:#ffc;"
| 71 || 18 || 12:30 pm || Pittsburgh Penguins || 2–3 SO || Philadelphia Flyers || Wells Fargo Center (19,927) || 44–21–6 || 94
|- style="background:#cfc;"
| 72 || 20 || 7:00 pm || Winnipeg Jets || 4–8 || Pittsburgh Penguins || Consol Energy Center (18,589) || 45–21–6 || 96
|- style="background:#cfc;"
| 73 || 22 || 7:00 pm || Nashville Predators || 1–5 || Pittsburgh Penguins || Consol Energy Center (18,579) || 46–21–6 || 98
|- style="background:#fcf;"
| 74 || 24 || 7:00 pm || Pittsburgh Penguins || 4–8 || Ottawa Senators || Scotiabank Place (20,076) || 46–22–6 || 98
|- style="background:#cfc;"
| 75 || 25 || 7:00 pm || New Jersey Devils || 2–5 || Pittsburgh Penguins || Consol Energy Center (18,601) || 47–22–6 || 100
|- style="background:#fcf;"
| 76 || 27 || 7:00 pm || New York Islanders || 5–3 || Pittsburgh Penguins || Consol Energy Center (18,588) || 47–23–6 || 100
|- style="background:#fcf;"
| 77 || 29 || 7:00 pm || Pittsburgh Penguins || 3–5 || New York Islanders || Nassau Coliseum (12,018) || 47–24–6 || 100
|- style="background:#cfc;"
| 78 || 30 || 7:30 pm || Pittsburgh Penguins || 5–3 || Buffalo Sabres || First Niagara Center (18,690) || 48–24–6 || 102
|-

|- style="background:#fcf;"
| 79 || 1 || 7:30 pm || Philadelphia Flyers || 6–4 || Pittsburgh Penguins || Consol Energy Center (18,601) || 48–25–6 || 102
|- style="background:#cfc;"
| 80 || 3 || 7:30 pm || Pittsburgh Penguins || 5–3 || Boston Bruins || TD Garden (17,565) || 49–25–6 || 104
|- style="background:#cfc;"
| 81 || 5 || 7:00 pm || New York Rangers || 2–5 || Pittsburgh Penguins || Consol Energy Center (18,585) || 50–25–6 || 106
|- style="background:#cfc;"
| 82 || 7 || 4:00 pm || Philadelphia Flyers || 2–4 || Pittsburgh Penguins || Consol Energy Center (18,616) || 51–25–6 || 108
|- style="text-align:center;"

|- style="text-align:center;"
| Legend:       = Win       = Loss       = OT/SO Loss

Standings

Detailed records 
Final

Stanley Cup playoffs

The Pittsburgh Penguins qualified for the Stanley Cup Playoffs for the sixth consecutive season, but lost in six games to the Philadelphia Flyers.

Playoff log

|-  style="background:#fcf;"
| 1 || April 11 || Philadelphia || 4–3 || Pittsburgh || OT || Crosby, Kennedy, Dupuis || Briere, Briere, Schenn, Voracek || Fleury (0–1) || 18,565 || 1–0 
|-  style="background:#fcf;"
| 2 || April 13 || Philadelphia || 8–5 || Pittsburgh || || Crosby, Kunitz, Martin, Kunitz, Kennedy || Talbot, Giroux, Giroux, Couturier, Couturier, Jagr, Couturier, Giroux || Fleury (0–2) || 18,626 || 2–0 
|-  style="background:#fcf;"
| 3 || April 15 || Pittsburgh || 4–8 || Philadelphia || || Staal, Neal, Neal, Staal || Talbot, Briere, Briere, Read, Read, Simmonds, Giroux, Talbot || Fleury (0–3) || 20,092 || 3–0 
|-  style="background:#cfc;"
| 4 || April 18 || Pittsburgh || 10–3 || Philadelphia || || Malkin, Niskanen, Crosby, Staal, Letang, Staal, Sullivan, Dupuis, Staal, Malkin || Giroux, Timonen, Voracek || Fleury (1–3) || 20,172 || 3–1 
|-  style="background:#cfc;"
| 5 || April 20 || Philadelphia || 2–3 || Pittsburgh || || Sullivan, Staal, Kennedy || Carle, Hartnell || Fleury (2–3) || 18,628 || 3–2 
|-  style="background:#fcf;"
| 6 || April 22 || Pittsburgh || 1–5 || Philadelphia || || Malkin || Giroux, Hartnell, Gustafsson, Briere, Schenn || Fleury (2–4) || 20,127 || 4–2 
|-

|- 
| Legend:       = Win       = Loss       = Playoff series win      Bold = Game Winning Goal

Player statistics
Skaters

Goaltenders

†Denotes player spent time with another team before joining Penguins. Stats reflect time with Penguins only.
‡Traded mid-season. Stats reflect time with Penguins only.

Notable achievements

Awards

Team awards
Awarded on April 5, 2012

Milestones

Transactions
The Penguins have been involved in the following transactions during the 2011–12 season:

Trades

Free agents acquired

Free agents lost

Claimed via waivers

Lost via waivers

Player signings

Draft picks

The Penguins' selected five players at the 2011 NHL Entry Draft.

Draft notes
 The Penguins' third-round pick went to the Phoenix Coyotes as the result of a trade on June 7, 2011, that sent Ilya Bryzgalov to the Philadelphia Flyers in exchange for Matt Clackson, future considerations and this conditional pick. The condition – Philadelphia signs Bryzgalov before the start of the third round of the draft – was converted on June 23, 2011. Philadelphia previously acquired the pick as the result of a trade on June 25, 2010 that sent Dan Hamhuis to Pittsburgh in exchange for this pick.
 The Penguins' fourth-round pick went to the Edmonton Oilers as the result of a trade on January 17, 2009, that sent Mathieu Garon to Pittsburgh in exchange for Dany Sabourin, Ryan Stone and this pick.
 The Penguins' seventh-round pick went to the Ottawa Senators as the result of a February 24, 2011, trade that sent Alexei Kovalev to the Penguins in exchange for this pick, the specific pick being conditional at the time of the trade. The condition – Pittsburgh does not advance to the 2011 Eastern Conference Semi-finals – was converted on April 27, 2011.
  The San Jose Sharks' seventh-round pick went to the Penguins as the result of a trade on June 26, 2010, that sent a seventh-round pick in 2010 to San Jose in exchange for this pick.

See also
 2011–12 NHL season
 2012 Stanley Cup playoffs

References

Pittsburgh Penguins seasons
Pittsburgh Penguins season, 2011–12
P
Pitts
Pitts